Capparis mollicella is a species of plant in the Capparaceae family. It is endemic to Mexico and Costa Rica.

References

 Biodiversidad de Costa Rica via INBio Especimenes 1997.  Accessed on 28 April 2011

Flora of Mexico
mollicella
Vulnerable plants
Taxonomy articles created by Polbot